Peter Caninenberg (born 28 September 1956) is a German field hockey player. He competed in the men's tournament at the 1976 Summer Olympics.

References

External links
 

1956 births
Living people
German male field hockey players
Olympic field hockey players of West Germany
Field hockey players at the 1976 Summer Olympics
Sportspeople from Munich